The Whipple Museum of the History of Science is a museum attached to the University of Cambridge, United Kingdom, which houses an extensive collection of scientific instruments, apparatus, models, pictures, prints, photographs, books and other material related to the history of science. It is located in the former Perse School on Free School Lane, and was founded in 1944, when Robert Whipple presented his collection of scientific instruments to the University of Cambridge. The museum's collection is 'designated' by the Museums, Libraries and Archives Council (MLA) as being of "national and international importance".

The museum is one of eight museums in the University of Cambridge Museums consortium.

Department of History and Philosophy of Science

The museum forms part of the Department of History and Philosophy of Science, University of Cambridge. The department includes a working library with a large collection of early scientific books, some of which were given by Robert Whipple. The museum plays an important part in the department's teaching and research.

Collections 

The museum's holdings are particularly strong in material dating from the 17th to the 19th centuries, especially objects produced by English instrument makers, although the collection contains objects dating from the medieval period to the present day. Instruments of astronomy, navigation, surveying, drawing and calculating are well represented, as are sundials, mathematical instruments and early electrical apparatus.

Since Robert Whipple's initial gift of the collection, the museum has come to house many instruments formerly used in the Colleges and Departments of the University of Cambridge.

Opening hours 

The Whipple Museum is open from Monday to Friday, 12.30 - 4.30pm.

See also 

Jim Bennett, a previous curator, moved to the History of Science Museum, Oxford.
History of science

References

External links 
The Whipple Museum's website
Department of History and Philosophy of Science information
University of Cambridge libraries and museums information

Museums established in 1944
Biographical museums in Cambridgeshire
History of science museums
Museums in Cambridge
Museums of the University of Cambridge
Institutions in the School of the Humanities and Social Sciences, University of Cambridge
Science museums in England
1944 establishments in England
Science and technology in Cambridgeshire